The 2013 World Weightlifting Championships were held in Wrocław, Poland. The event took place from October 20 to 27, 2013.

Medal summary

Men

Women

Medal table
Ranking by Big (Total result) medals
 

Ranking by all medals: Big (Total result) and Small (Snatch and Clean & Jerk)

Team ranking

Men

Women

Participating nations
A total of 292 competitors from 55 nations participated.

 (3)
 (1)
 (3)
 (3)
 (10)
 (7)
 (5)
 (7)
 (15)
 (1)
 (15)
 (2)
 (2)
 (15)
 (4)
 (3)
 (4)
 (4)
 (3)
 (2)
 (2)
 (3)
 (4)
 (8)
 (1)
 (2)
 (12)
 (13)
 (1)
 (1)
 (1)
 (2)
 (2)
 (8)
 (2)
 (1)
 (1)
 (8)
 (15)
 (1)
 (2)
 (15)
 (1)
 (2)
 (2)
 (2)
 (6)
 (2)
 (10)
 (8)
 (8)
 (15)
 (8)
 (10)
 (4)

References
General
2013 IWF World Championships Results Book 

Specific

External links
Official website
Total results 

 
2013
World Weightlifting Championships
World Weightlifting Championships
World Weightlifting Championships
International weightlifting competitions hosted by Poland